The Chinese Elm Ulmus parvifolia cultivar 'Small Frye' is to be released by Plant Introductions Inc. of Georgia

Description
'Small Frye' is distinguished by its small size and broad rounded crown bearing dark green foliage. The tree also has the exfoliating bark typical of the species.

Pests and diseases
The species and its cultivars are highly resistant, but not immune, to Dutch elm disease, and unaffected by the Elm Leaf Beetle Xanthogaleruca luteola.

Cultivation
The tree is not known to be in cultivation beyond the US.

Accessions
None known.

References

Chinese elm cultivar
Ulmus articles missing images
Ulmus